"A Love Song" is a song written by Kenny Loggins and Dona Lyn George, first released by the folk-rock duo Loggins and Messina in 1973 on their album Full Sail. Country artist Anne Murray (who'd taken her recording of another Loggins & Messina recording, "Danny's Song", to the top-ten in late 1972) covered the song later that year for her album of the same name.

Released in December 1973, Murray's version became a major crossover hit early in 1974. In her native Canada, it topped all three singles charts: the overall Top Singles chart, the Country Tracks chart and the Adult Contemporary chart. In the United States, the song peaked at No. 5 on the Billboard magazine Hot Country Singles chart and just missed the Top 10 of the Billboard Hot 100, peaking at No. 12. The song fared even better there in the adult contemporary market — it became Murray's third chart-topper on Billboard's American Hot Adult Contemporary Singles chart. (In Canada, it was her seventh No. 1 on both the country and adult contemporary charts.)  This was Murray's second Loggins & Messina cover, having charted with her version of their "Danny's Song" the previous year.

At the 17th Annual Grammy Awards in 1975, Anne Murray won the first of her three Grammy Awards for Best Female Country Vocal Performance for this song. The song also appears on Murray's 2007 album Anne Murray Duets: Friends & Legends, performed as a duet with the K. d. Lang.

Later versions include Dar Williams, Jonathan Rayson and Kenny Loggins.

Personnel on Loggins & Messina version
 Kenny Loggins – lead vocals, classical acoustic guitar
 Jim Messina – harmony vocals, acoustic guitar, banjo
 Jon Clarke – bass flute, alto flute
 Al Garth – recorder
 Larry Sims – bass, backing vocals
 Merel Bregante – drums, backing vocals
 Michael Omartian – piano
 Milt Holland – shakers, triangle, congas, pandeiro

Chart history

Weekly charts

Year-end charts

References

1974 singles
Songs written by Kenny Loggins
Kenny Loggins songs
Loggins and Messina songs
Anne Murray songs
RPM Top Singles number-one singles
Capitol Records singles
1973 songs
Song recordings produced by Brian Ahern (producer)